Sciaenochromis benthicola is a species of cichlid endemic to Lake Malawi.  It can reach a length of  SL.

References

benthicola
Fish of Lake Malawi
Fish of Malawi
Fish described in 1993
Taxa named by Ad Konings
Taxonomy articles created by Polbot